The canton of Ambazac is an administrative division of the Haute-Vienne department, western France. Its borders were modified at the French canton reorganisation which came into effect in March 2015. Its seat is in Ambazac.

It consists of the following communes:
 
Ambazac
Bersac-sur-Rivalier
Bessines-sur-Gartempe
Les Billanges
Bonnac-la-Côte
Folles
Fromental
Jabreilles-les-Bordes
La Jonchère-Saint-Maurice
Laurière
Razès
Saint-Laurent-les-Églises
Saint-Léger-la-Montagne
Saint-Sulpice-Laurière
Saint-Sylvestre

References

Cantons of Haute-Vienne